José Riesco (born 27 February 1976) is a Peruvian hurdler. He competed in the men's 110 metres hurdles at the 1996 Summer Olympics.

References

1976 births
Living people
Athletes (track and field) at the 1996 Summer Olympics
Peruvian male hurdlers
Olympic athletes of Peru
Place of birth missing (living people)